Cyrtopogon marginalis is a species of robber flies, also called assassin flies, in the family Asilidae.

References

Asilidae
Articles created by Qbugbot
Insects described in 1866